Lwin Moe (born 1970) is a three-time Myanmar Academy Award winning Burmese film actor.

He was born on an island in the Mergui Archipelago at the southern end of Myanmar. Father of two girls, Lwin Moe was a UNICEF "partner" for Myanmar in 2005. His grandfather is a Punjab (India) origin.

Lwin Moe has different talents including acting, singing, and photography. He is famous for his acting roles in comedy movies, and also used to sing several songs. He took a break from the movie business beginning around 2005.

Lwin Moe's brother Maung Thi is a famous director in Myanmar. The actor's wife was one of the TV representatives in Myanmar. His daughter Yun Waddy Lwin Moe is also a model and actress.

Lwin Moe is also an aspiring photographer.

Filmography

Daughter And Mothers (1991)
Sein Khaw Nay Tae A Chit (1994)
Pann Thakhin (1996)
Never Shall We Be Enslaved (1997)
Yin Tae Ka Saung Yar Thi (1999)
Maung Mu Paing Shin (2000)
Pan Ta Pwint Phan Sin Chinn (2001)
Thamee Mite (2001)
Ta Khar Ka Ayeyarwady Nya Myar (2004)
Myet Nhar Myar Tae Kaung Kin (2004)Stranger's House (2019)What Happened to the Wolf?'' (2021)

References

1970 births
Living people
Burmese male film actors
Burmese photographers
UNICEF Goodwill Ambassadors
People from Tanintharyi Region
Burmese people of Indian descent
Burmese people of Punjabi descent